Ulrike Popp (born 24 June 1955) is an Austrian handball player who played for the Austria women's national handball team. She represented Austria at the 1984 Summer Olympics in Los Angeles.

References

1955 births
Living people
Austrian female handball players
Olympic handball players of Austria
Handball players at the 1984 Summer Olympics